This article lists diplomatic missions accredited to the Holy See, the government of the Catholic Church and the temporal ruler of the Vatican City. 85 countries currently maintain embassies to the Holy See. The Vatican City State, over which the Holy See is sovereign, is the smallest independent entity in the world and its size renders any resident diplomatic community impractical. Therefore, all embassies to the Holy See are located in Rome making Vatican City one of only two sovereign states, the other being Liechtenstein, with no resident embassies located within its territory. This leads to the situation that the Embassy of Italy to the Holy See is based on its home territory, which is also the case for Iceland, Latvia, and Sweden. This also means that an embassy of the Republic of China (more commonly known as Taiwan) to the Holy See is located in Italy, which does not recognize the Republic of China.

Embassies to the Holy See usually do not maintain consular sections, allowing their other embassy or consulate in Rome or another elsewhere to provide services to those holding passports issued by the Holy See. A notable exception is that of the Philippines, whose consular section caters to the Filipino pilgrims to Catholic pilgrimage sites in Italy and the Filipino members of religious congregations.

Embassies in Rome

Gallery

Accredited Embassies in Berlin

Accredited Embassies in Paris

Accredited Embassies in Switzerland

 (Geneva)
 (Geneva)
 (Bern)
 (Bern)
 (Bern)
 (Geneva)
 (Bern)
 (Bern)
 (Geneva)
 (Geneva)
 (Geneva)
 (Bern)
 (Bern)
 (Geneva)

Accredited Embassies in London

Accredited Embassies in Brussels

Accredited Embassies in United States

 (New York City)
 (Washington D.C.)
 (Washington D.C.)
 (New York City)
 (New York City)

Accredited Embassies elsewhere 

 (Andorra la Vella)
 (St John's)
 (Nassau)
 (Stockholm)
 (Lisbon)
 (Djibouti City)
 (Roseau)
 (Tallinn)
 (Reykjavík)
 (Riga)
 (Vaduz)
 (Valletta)
 (Prague)
 (Vienna)
 (Madrid)
 (Zagreb)
 (Singapore)
 (The Hague)
 (Stockholm)
 (Madrid)
 (Madrid)

Non-resident representative offices 
 (Rome, Delegation to UN)

Countries without formal diplomatic missions to Holy See

References

External links
 Ministry of Foreign Affairs to the Holy See

 
 
Diplomatic missions
Diplomatic missions
Holy See